Manana Archvadze-Gamsakhurdia is a Georgian pediatrician, activist and politician. She served as the inaugural First Lady of independent Georgia from 1991 to 1992 as the wife of President Zviad Gamsakhurdia.

References

Living people
Date of birth unknown
Year of birth unknown
First ladies and gentlemen of Georgia (country)
Pediatricians from Georgia (country)
20th-century women politicians from Georgia (country)
20th-century politicians from Georgia (country)
Year of birth missing (living people)